Carlos Alberto Costa Dias (born 5 May 1967) is a former Brazilian football player. He has played for Brazil's national team.

Club statistics

National team statistics

References

External links

1967 births
Living people
Brazilian footballers
Brazilian football managers
Brazilian expatriate footballers
Association football forwards
Campeonato Brasileiro Série A players
Botafogo de Futebol e Regatas players
Coritiba Foot Ball Club players
CR Vasco da Gama players
Grêmio Foot-Ball Porto Alegrense players
Paraná Clube players
Japan Soccer League players
J1 League players
Shonan Bellmare players
Shimizu S-Pulse players
Tokyo Verdy players
Expatriate footballers in Japan
Sociedade Esportiva do Gama managers
Brazil international footballers
Footballers from Brasília